Taihō or Taiho can refer to:
Taihō (era), a Japanese name for the years 701–704
Taihō Code, a reorganization of the Japanese government at the end of the Asuka period
Taiho Pharmaceutical
Taihoku Prefecture, a former administrative district of Taiwan, created during Japanese rule in 1920
Japanese aircraft carrier Taihō
A title from the anime series The Twelve Kingdoms
Taiho Shichauzo, a manga series alternatively titled You're Under Arrest
Taihō Kōki, sumo wrestler
Yasuaki Taiho, Taiwanese professional baseball player